The Chautauqua County Courthouse, located at 215 North Chautauqua Street in Sedan, is the seat of government of Chautauqua County, Kansas. Sedan has been the county seat since 1875. The courthouse was built from 1917 to 1918 by contractor Louis Fred Nebelong. 

Architect George P. Washburn & Sons of Ottawa, Kansas designed the courthouse in the Classical Revival style. The courthouse is two stories and faces east. It is constructed of red-colored brick, limestone, and concrete with a flat roof. It is located on spacious landscaped grounds in the center of the city. The front has a portico supported by four Ionic columns which rise to a wide header at the roof.

The current courthouse is the second structure used as a courthouse. The first courthouse was a stone, two-story structure built in 1875-77 by H. B. Kelly. 

George P. Washburn & Sons also designed courthouses in Anderson County, Atchison County, Butler County, Doniphan County, Franklin County, Harper County, Kingman County, Miami County, Pratt County and Woodson County, and Beaver County, Oklahoma.

See also
 List of county courthouses in Kansas

External links
 Chautauqua County at American Courthouses
 Historic postcard images

Buildings and structures in Chautauqua County, Kansas
County courthouses in Kansas
Neoclassical architecture in Kansas
Government buildings completed in 1926